Monokini  is Stereo Total's second album released in 1997.

Track listing

"Ach Ach Liebling"  – 1.58
"Lunatique"  – 2.13
"Supergirl"  – 2.32
"Furore"  – 2.53
"Schön Von Hinten"  – 2.50
"Dilindam"  – 2.36
"Cosmonaute"  – 3.02
"Aua"  – 2.04
"Und Wer Wird Sich Um Mich Kümmern?"  – 1.54
"Tu M'As Voulue"  – 2.10
"Moustique"  – 2.23
"La, Ca, USA"  – 1.49
"L'Appareil A Sous"  – 2.04
"Grand Prix Eurovision"  – 4.15
"Ushilo Sugata Ga Kilei"  – 3.19

References

1997 albums
Stereo Total albums